Send Me Away With A Smile is a World War I song written by Louis Weslyn and composed by Al Piantadosi. The song was first published in 1917 by Al. Piantadosi & Co., Inc. in New York, NY. The sheet music cover depicts a woman waving to a soldier from a fenced yard with an inset photo of Rita Gould.

The famous Irish tenor, John McCormack, had a very popular recording of this song in 1918. M.J. O'Connell also received popularity with his recording of the song in 1918.

The sheet music can be found at the Pritzker Military Museum & Library.

References 

Bibliography
Parker, Bernard S. World War I Sheet Music Vol 1. Jefferson: McFarland & Company, Inc., 2007. . 
Paas, John Roger. 2014. America sings of war: American sheet music from World War I. . 
Tyler, Don. Hit songs, 1900-1955: American popular music of the pre-rock era. Jefferson, N.C.: McFarland, 2007. . 
Vogel, Frederick G. World War I Songs: A History and Dictionary of Popular American Patriotic Tunes, with Over 300 Complete Lyrics. Jefferson: McFarland & Company, Inc., 1995. . 

Songs about parting
1917 songs
Songs of World War I
Songs written by Al Piantadosi